Three Brothers, three separate mountains of the Mid North Coast region of New South Wales, Australia, are situated approximately  north of Sydney.

Location and features
Collectively referred to as the Three Brothers, the mountains are three separate mountains named and located as follows:
North Brother: with an elevation of   
Middle Brother: with an elevation of   
South Brother: with an elevation of   

The South Brother lies within the Mid-Coast Council local government area; while the Middle and North Brothers are located with the Port Macquarie-Hastings Council area,

The North and Middle Brothers have been declared national parks, named Dooragan National Park and Middle Brother National Park respectively.

The main radio and television transmitters for the Mid North Coast region are located on the summit of Middle Brother.

Etymology

The Australian Aboriginal local Birpai people tell a dreamtime story of three brothers who were killed by a witch called Widjirriejuggi and were buried where the mountains stand. The youngest of the three was Dooragan, that now carries the name for one of the national parks.

Coincidentally, when Captain James Cook passed the area on 12 May 1770, he also named the mountains Three Brothers, since "these Hills bore some resemblance to each other".

References

Mountains of New South Wales
Mid North Coast
Mid-Coast Council
Port Macquarie-Hastings Council